Saurida is a genus of fish in the family Synodontidae.

Species
There are currently 23 recognized species in this genus:
 Saurida argentea W. J. Macleay, 1881 (Short-fin saury)
 Saurida brasiliensis Norman, 1935 (Brazilian lizardfish)
 Saurida caribbaea Breder, 1927 (Small-scale lizardfish)
 Saurida elongata (Temminck & Schlegel, 1846) (Slender lizardfish)
 Saurida filamentosa J. D. Ogilby, 1910 (Thread-fin lizardfish)
 Saurida flamma Waples, 1982 (Orange-mouth lizardfish)
 Saurida golanii B. C. Russell, 2011 (Golani's lizardfish) 
 Saurida gracilis (Quoy & Gaimard, 1824) (Gracile lizardfish)
 Saurida isarankurai Shindo & Yamada, 1972 (Short-jaw saury)
 Saurida lessepsianus B. C. Russell, Golani & Tikochinski, 2015 (Lessepsian lizardfish) 
 Saurida longimanus Norman, 1939 (Long-fin lizardfish)
 Saurida macrolepis S. Tanaka (I), 1917
 Saurida microlepis H. W. Wu & Ki. Fu. Wang, 1931
 Saurida micropectoralis Shindo & Yamada, 1972 (Short-fin lizardfish)
 Saurida nebulosa Valenciennes, 1850 (Clouded lizardfish)
 Saurida normani Longley, 1935 (Short-jaw lizardfish)
 Saurida pseudotumbil Dutt & Sagar, 1981
 Saurida suspicio Breder, 1927 (Suspicious lizardfish)
 Saurida tumbil (Bloch, 1795) (Greater lizardfish)
 Saurida tweddlei B. C. Russell, 2015 
 Saurida umeyoshii Inoue & Nakabo, 2006 
 Saurida undosquamis (J. Richardson, 1848) (Brush-tooth lizardfish)
 Saurida wanieso Shindo & Yamada, 1972 (Wanieso lizardfish)

References

 
Marine fish genera
Taxa named by Achille Valenciennes